Matinae is a subfamily of predaceous diving beetles in the family Dytiscidae. There are at least 3 genera and about 10 described species in Matinae.

Genera
These three genera belong to the subfamily Matinae:
 Allomatus Mouchamps, 1964
 Batrachomatus Clark, 1863
 Matus Aubé, 1836

References

Further reading

External links

Dytiscidae
Articles created by Qbugbot